EP Europace is a peer-reviewed medical journal published by Oxford University Press that publishes research articles about the study and management of cardiac arrhythmias, cardiac pacing, and cardiac cellular electrophysiology. It is 1 of 13 official journals of the European Society of Cardiology and is the official journal of the society's working groups on Cardiac Cellular Electrophysiology and e-Cardiology and of the European Heart Rhythm Association.

Abstracting and indexing 
The journal is abstracted and indexed in the following database:

According to the Journal Citation Reports, the journal has a 2017 impact factor of 5.231 and is ranked 25th out of 128 journals in the Cardiac and Cardiovascular Systems category.

History 
Europace was founded in 1999, with Richard Sutton as the founding Editor-in-chief.  In 2007, A. John Camm became Editor-in-chief, who was succeeded by Gerhardt Hindricks in 2018.

References

External links 
 

Cardiology journals
Monthly journals
English-language journals
Cambridge University Press academic journals
Publications established in 1999
Academic journals associated with international learned and professional societies of Europe